Sno-Isle Libraries is a public library system serving Island and Snohomish counties in the U.S. state of Washington. The system is among the largest in Washington state and has an annual circulation of 11 million materials. The library's 23 branches and bookmobile services reach every incorporated city in the two counties, with the exception of Everett (which retains its own municipal system) and Woodway. Sno-Isle was formed in 1962, from the merger of two systems serving each county that were established in 1944 and 1962.

History

While cities in Island and Snohomish counties established their own libraries in the early 20th century, the first inter-city system was created by voters in unincorporated Snohomish County on April 2, 1944. The state government sponsored demonstration library and bookmobile projects on Camano and Whidbey islands in 1961, spurring interest in establishing an Island County system. The Island County Rural Library District was established by voters in November 1962 and merged with the Snohomish County system on December 17, forming the Snohomish-Island Inter-County Rural Library District.

The new library system was named "Sno-Isle" to reflect the two counties. Initially, the Sno-Isle Regional Library signed contracts with incorporated cities to operate their libraries and join the system for a fixed amount. Rural branches would rely on property taxes generated within the district, as well as donations from organizations and members of the community. Incorporated cities began voting to annex themselves into the Sno-Isle district in the late 1980s, with promises of new libraries and potential cost savings over the contracted service.

All Sno-Isle branches were closed in March 2020 due to the COVID-19 pandemic, but reopened with curbside pick-up service three months later. In-person services resumed at some branches in early 2021.

Branches

, the Sno-Isle Libraries system has 23 branches. They serve every city in Island and Snohomish counties, with the exception of two cities: Everett, which has its own system, and Woodway, which had contracted service until 1978. Two of the locations, in the Mariner area of Everett and Smokey Point area of Arlington, are "demonstration" libraries that are in leased retail spaces that precede a permanent branch. The Camano Island location was formerly a demonstration library that was replaced by a permanent branch in 2015.

Operations

The Sno-Isle Libraries system is headquartered at an administration and processing center on the Tulalip Indian Reservation, west of Marysville. It is governed by a seven-member board of trustees, of whom two are appointed by Island County and five by Snohomish County. The system is overseen by an executive director that is appointed by the board of trustees. Jonalyn Woolf-Ivory, a longtime library employee, was appointed as executive director in 2002 and retired in 2018.

The library system has an annual budget of $57 million, with 98 percent of revenue funded by a property tax levied on all properties within the district. The remaining two percent of revenue comes from a timber excise tax, a leasehold excise tax, contract fees from municipal governments, and donations.

In 2016, Sno-Isle had a total circulation of 11.3 million items, placing it second in the state of Washington behind the King County Library System. It had the state's highest turnover rate, at 9.22 checkouts per item.

See also
Everett Public Library

References

External links

Sno-Isle Libraries at WorldCat
Sno-Isle Libraries at LibraryTechnology.org

County library systems in Washington (state)
Education in Island County, Washington
Education in Snohomish County, Washington